Ebalina is a genus of small sea snails, marine gastropod mollusks in the family Pyramidellidae, the pyrams and their allies.

Species
 Ebalina conjuncta Peñas & Rolán, 2016
 Ebalina diaphana (A. Adams, 1861)
 Ebalina monolirata (de Folin, 1873)
 Ebalina scripta Peñas & Rolán, 2016
 Ebalina similiter Peñas & Rolán, 2016
 Ebalina torniformae Peñas & Rolán, 2016
 Ebalina undata Peñas & Rolán, 2016
 Ebalina varellensis Saurin, 1959
 Ebalina vixornata (de Folin, 1878)

References

 Peñas A. & Rolán E. (2016). Deep water Pyramidelloidea from the central and South Pacific. 3. The tribes Eulimellini and Syrnolini. Universidade de Santiago de Compostela. 304 pp.

External links

Pyramidellidae